Dave Walls (born January 29, 1977), is a sports anchor and reporter for WSET-TV in Lynchburg, Virginia.

Walls began his career as a radio talent, reporting and anchoring news and traffic for WDEL and WSTW in Wilmington, Delaware. During his time, Walls served as a correspondent for the 2003 Little League World Series in Williamsport, PA, covering Delaware's squad in the Mid-Atlantic Region. In Summer 2006, Walls joined the cast of The Price Is Right Live! as the announcer for the remaining shows at Bally's Atlantic City, working with David Ruprecht, Todd Newton, and JD Roberto.

Walls has also worked as a play by play broadcaster for the National Lacrosse League's Philadelphia Wings franchise. Starting in 2010, he served as the voice of the franchise's broadcasts for 5 seasons, until the franchise relocated to Connecticut after the 2014 season. During that time, Walls hosted the team's "Wings All Access" radio show, and served as the league's halftime show host for all games.

In 2014, Walls was hired as a news reporter and anchor, filling in as a sports anchor and co-host of "Good Morning Virginia". In January 2016, Walls moved into the open sports anchor position alongside 33 year WSET veteran, Dennis Carter. During his off time, Walls works as a freelance voice over artist for local and national commercials.

References

External links
Dave Walls ABC 13 Bio Page
Website featuring NLL and Voice Over Work

1977 births
Living people
American television journalists
American male journalists
People from Wilmington, Delaware
Liberty University alumni